The 1986 Wandsworth Council election took place on 8 May 1986 to elect members of Wandsworth London Borough Council in London, England. The whole council was up for election and the Conservative party stayed in overall control of the council.

Background

Election result

Ward results

References

1986
1986 London Borough council elections